is a former Japanese football player.

Playing career
Fukushige was born in Wakayama Prefecture on January 30, 1971. After graduating from Osaka University of Health and Sport Sciences, he joined Japan Football League (JFL) club Kyoto Shiko (later Kyoto Purple Sanga) in 1993. He played many matches as center back and the club was promoted to J1 League in 1996. However he did not play in any matches 1996. In 1997, he moved to the JFL club Otsuka Pharmaceutical. He played as a regular player for two seasons and retired at the end of the 1998 season.

Club statistics

References

External links

kyotosangadc

1971 births
Living people
Osaka University of Health and Sport Sciences alumni
Association football people from Wakayama Prefecture
Japanese footballers
J1 League players
Japan Football League (1992–1998) players
Kyoto Sanga FC players
Tokushima Vortis players
Association football defenders